Rob Wiederstein (born April 3, 1968) is an American politician. He represented District 11 as a Democrat in the Kentucky House of Representatives from 2019 to 2021.

Early life 

Wiederstein was born in Louisville, Kentucky. He earned a BA in Economics from Hanover College in 1990 and a JD from Indiana University in 1993.

Political career 

Wiederstein was a judge for the 51st District Court in Kentucky from 1999 to 2016.

In 2018, Wiederstein was elected to represent District 11 in the Kentucky House of Representatives. He is running for re-election in 2020.

Electoral record

References 

Living people
Democratic Party members of the Kentucky House of Representatives
1968 births
21st-century American politicians